Seokju Hong (born 7 May 2003) is a South Korean professional footballer who plays as a midfielder for Viktoria Köln.

Career
On 24 August 2021, Hong made his starting debut for Viktoria Köln in the 3. Liga, in a 3–0 loss against 1860 Munich.

References

External links
 

2003 births
Living people
South Korean footballers
Association football midfielders
3. Liga players
FC Viktoria Köln players
South Korean expatriate footballers
South Korean expatriate sportspeople in Germany
Expatriate footballers in Germany